Strasburg may refer to:

Places

Austria
Straßburg, Austria, in Carinthia

Germany
Strasburg, Germany, Mecklenburg-Western Pomerania

Poland
Brodnica, Kuyavian-Pomeranian Voivodeship, known in German as  before World War I

Romania
Aiud, Alba County

Ukraine
Kuchurhan, Rozdilna Raion, formerly Strassburg

United States
Strasburg, Colorado, divided between Adams County and Arapahoe County
Strasburg, Illinois
Strasburg, Missouri
Strasburg, North Dakota
Strasburg, Ohio
Strasburg, Pennsylvania
Strasburg Township, Lancaster County, Pennsylvania

People
Stephen Strasburg (born 1988), baseball player

Other uses 
 Battle of Strasburg, during the American Civil War
 French battleship Strasbourg
 French cruiser Strasbourg
 RC Strasbourg Alsace, a French football team
 "Strasbourg" (song), a 2004 single from The Rakes
 Strasbourg IG, a French basketball club

See also 
Strasbourg
Strasberg, a surname
Straßberg (disambiguation)
Strasburger, the name of a prominent Polish-German family

German-language surnames